The Church of Jesus Christ of Latter-day Saints in Ohio refers to the Church of Jesus Christ of Latter-day Saints (LDS Church) and its members in Ohio. The official church membership as a percentage of general population was 0.52% in 2014. According to the 2014 Pew Forum on Religion & Public Life survey, roughly 1% of Ohioans self-identify themselves most closely with The Church of Jesus Christ of Latter-day Saints. The LDS Church is the 14th largest denomination in Ohio.

Stakes are located in Akron, Cincinnati (3), Cleveland, Columbus (4), Dayton (3), Kirtland, Toledo, Youngstown, and Zanesville.

History

Kirtland, Ohio, became LDS Church headquarters from 1831 to 1838 and at its peak, Kirtland was home to 3,200 members.

In 1979, the Church acquired the Newel K. Whitney store, which is now a popular historic site. About 100,000 people, mostly church members, visit the site annually and it was given a $15 million facelift to renovate and rebuild 10 buildings.

Stakes
As of March 2022, the following stakes ware located in Ohio:
Akron Ohio Stake
Cincinnati Ohio Stake
Cincinnati Ohio East Stake
Cincinnati Ohio North Stake
Cleveland Ohio Stake
Columbus Ohio East Stake
Columbus Ohio North Stake
Columbus Ohio South Stake
Columbus Ohio Stake
Dayton Ohio Stake
Dayton Ohio East Stake
Dayton Ohio North Stake
Kirtland Ohio Stake
Toledo Ohio Stake
Youngstown Ohio Stake
Zanesville Ohio Stake

Historic Sites

Many of the church's historic sites in Ohio are in the northeastern part of the state. This includes Kirtland, where the church was headquartered in the 1830s.
Amherst, Ohio
East Branch of the Chagrin River
Fairport Harbor
Hyrum Smith home
Joseph Smith Properties
Kirtland Flats Schoolhouse
Kirtland Historic North Cemetery
Kirtland Temple and Visitors’ Center
Kirtland Visitors Center for the Church of Jesus Christ of Latter-Day Saints
John Johnson Farm near Hiram, Ohio
Morley Farm in Kirtland, Ohio
Newel K. and Elizabeth Ann Whitney Home
N. K. Whitney & Co. Store
Orange Township
Sawmill and Ashery in Kirtland
Stannard Quarry near Kirtland, Ohio
Thompson Township
Kirtland Camp Historical Marker near Dayton, Ohio

Missions
Ohio Cincinnati Mission
Ohio Columbus Mission

Temples

The Kirtland Temple was used by the main body of the church from 1836 to 1838. Unlike current operating LDS temples, the Kirtland Temple was used primarily for religious meetings rather than ordinance work. At the time of construction, none of the ordinances associated with LDS temple worship, such as baptism by proxy, had been instituted.  It is currently owned and operated by Community of Christ.

The Columbus Ohio Temple was dedicated on September 4, 1999, by President Gordon B. Hinckley.

The Cleveland Ohio Temple was announced on April 3, 2022, by President Russell M. Nelson.

See also

The Church of Jesus Christ of Latter-day Saints membership statistics (United States)
Ohio: Religion

References

External links
 Newsroom (Ohio)
 ComeUntoChrist.org Latter-day Saints Visitor site
 The Church of Jesus Christ of Latter-day Saints Official site

 

Ohio